Plocamostethus is a genus of beetles in the family Carabidae. It is endemic to New Zealand. The genus contains the following species:

 Plocamostethus planiusculus (White 1846)
 Plocamostethus scribae Johns, 2007

References

Pterostichinae
Endemic fauna of New Zealand
Beetles of New Zealand
Endemic insects of New Zealand